Don Sakers (June 16, 1958 – May 17, 2021) was an American science fiction writer and fan who lived in Maryland, and wrote several novels and edited a short story collection. In 2009 he succeeded Thomas Easton as book reviewer for Analog Science Fiction and Fact magazine. Sakers is probably best known in the science fiction community as a frequent guest speaker at science fiction conventions.

When asked about the reaction to the diversity elements in his SF, Sakers said:

Writing career and SF fandom
Sakers was the author of SF novels Dance for the Ivory Madonna (2002) and companion titles The Leaves of October (1988), A Voice in Every Wind (2003), Weaving the Web of Days (2004), and A Rose From Old Terra (2007);  and dark fantasy novel Curse of the Zwilling (2003).<ref>[http://www.sfandf.com/html/scifi-fantasy-books.html?id=2&p1=Don%20Sakers&p2=books Review of Curse of the Zwilling]. Accessed January 23, 2008.  </ref>  He was also author of the short story "The Cold Solution" (Analog, 1991) and other short fiction. Sakers was editor of Carmen Miranda's Ghost Is Haunting Space Station Three (1990), an anthology of stories based on Leslie Fish's song of the same name; the SF Book of Days (2004); and the Gaylaxicon 2006 Sampler. Sakers was also the author of two gay young adult novels: Act Well Your Part (1986) and Lucky in Love (1988). Melissa Scott called him "a left wing Heinlein."

A member of the Science Fiction and Fantasy Writers of America, he wrote numerous obituaries for their web site, including that of Lisa A. Barnett.

Dance for the Ivory Madonna
According to a Publishers Weekly review, Dance for the Ivory Madonna is about when;

Sakers described the book as being about "a lot of things: friendship, toleration, a celebration of the creative spirit, a paean to unconventionality. It's about what's wrong with today's world, what's right with today's world, and what hope there is for the future. It's about how our technology affects us, and about the decisions we can make regarding those effects."Dance for the Ivory Madonna was a Spectrum Award finalist.

Science fiction conventions

Sakers was guest of honor at the 1995 Gaylaxicon,Gaylaxicon 1995 Badges and was a frequent guest speaker at other Gaylaxicons, Albacon, Arisia, and Boskone.

 Personal life 
Sakers was born in Yokosuka, Japan, but grew up in the United States. He was openly gay and had diabetes and autism. He shared a home in Anne Arundel County, Maryland with his spouse, costumer Thomas Atkinson.  Their house, known as Meerkat Meade, was featured in Weird Maryland.Reader's advice page about The Star Toys Museum.  Accessed June 23, 2008. His self-described "day job" was with the Anne Arundel County public library, where he worked for 42 years. Sakers was an active blogger.

Sakers died of a heart attack on May 17, 2021, aged 62.

Bibliography

 Novels 
Scattered Worlds Mosaic
 
 
 
 
 
 
 
 The Leaves of October (started as a short story in August 1983's Analog'', and was expanded as a novel in 1988)

Short fiction 
Collections
 
Stories

Review columns 

———————
Notes

References

External links
 Official web site
 Scattered Worlds web site
 

1958 births
2021 deaths
20th-century American novelists
20th-century American short story writers
21st-century American novelists
21st-century American short story writers
American librarians
American male novelists
American male short story writers
American science fiction writers
Analog Science Fiction and Fact people
American gay writers
American LGBT novelists
People from Anne Arundel County, Maryland
20th-century American male writers
21st-century American male writers
People on the autism spectrum
21st-century American LGBT people